Shane Hamilton (born 18 August 1970) is a former Australian rules footballer who played with Geelong and the Brisbane Bears in the VFL/AFL.

Hamilton was only 17 when he made his league debut for Geelong and in just his third game kicked 7 goals 4 against Sydney at the SCG. He played six games in 1989 but four of them were finals, including the famed 1989 VFL Grand Final against Hawthorn where he kicked a couple of goals in a losing cause.

He finished his career in Brisbane where he spent five seasons at the Bears and got more regular game time than he did when he was with the stronger Geelong.

Hamilton now coaches the Huntly Football Club in the Heathcote and District Football League.

References

Holmesby, Russell and Main, Jim (2007). The Encyclopedia of AFL Footballers. 7th ed. Melbourne: Bas Publishing.

1970 births
Living people
Australian rules footballers from Victoria (Australia)
Geelong Football Club players
Brisbane Bears players